Khar-Khori or Khar Khori is a tiny village in the Sivasagar tehsil, Sivasagar district, Assam state, India.  It is located about 330 km east by northeast of Dispur, 20 km west of Sivasagar, and 5 km southeast of the Brahmaputra river.  Its PIN is 785640.

According to the 2011 census, Khar Khori (census code 292599) had 10 households and 31 inhabitants (including 7 children aged 0–6). 23. Its literacy rate was 96%.

See also
 Khori (disambiguation)
 Kharkari (disambiguation)

References

Villages in Sivasagar district